Aouleiguatt is a village and rural commune in the Trarza Region of south-western Mauritania.

In 2000, it had a population of 8,467.

References

Communes of Trarza Region